The 1906 Drake Bulldogs football team was an American football team that represented Drake University as an independent during the 1906 college football season. In their first season under head coach Charles Pell, the Bulldogs compiled a 2–4–1 record and were outscored by a total of 62 to 41. The team played its home games at Haskins Field in Des Moines, Iowa.

Schedule

References

Drake
Drake Bulldogs football seasons
Drake Bulldogs football